The 2013 Italian Figure Skating Championships was held in Milan from December 19 through 22, 2012. Medals were awarded in the disciplines of men's singles, ladies' singles, pair skating, ice dancing, and synchronized skating on the senior and junior levels. The results are among the criteria used to choose Italy's teams for ISU Championships. On 5 December 2012, the Italian federation released the final selection criteria for the 2013 World Championships, 2013 European Championships, and 2013 World Junior Championships.

Senior results

Men
The Italian Federation selected Zandron for the European Championships and Bacchini for the World Championships but the president decided Bacchini should be sent to both.

Ladies

Pairs

Ice dancing

Synchronized

References

External links
 Official site
 2013 Italian Figure Skating Championships results
 Federazione Italiana Sport del Ghiaccio (Italian Ice Sports Federation)

2013
2012 in figure skating
Figure Skating Championships,2013